Hakupu is one of the fourteen villages of the island of Niue. According to the 2017 census, it has a population of 220, making it the second-largest village in Niue.

Geography
It is located in the southeast of the island, close to Matatamane Point, and is connected by road with the capital  Alofi (12 kilometres to the northwest), Avatele (7 kilometres to the west), and via the east coast road to Liku (12 kilometres), Lakepa (16 kilometres), and Mutalau (on the north coast, 20 kilometres away).

Popular sites

Hakupu Heritage and Cultural Park Area 
There is also a Heritage Park Area which was established in 1998. It extends south from the Tuhiā Access Track. Its primary objective is to protect areas of historical and ecological significance.

Hakupu War Memorial 
Hakupu has a memorial for soldiers who fought during the First World War, World War two, and the Malayan Emergency.

Anapala Chasm 
Descending 155 steps into a well known chasm and pool of fresh water situated near the track leading from the village of Hakupu to the sea, Anapala was a main source of fresh water for residents back in the day.

Internet access 
For a length of time, Hakupu has attempted to achieve internet access. As of July 2005, Hakupu is seven miles away from the nearest wireless access point. Technicians have attempted to use an abandoned building in the village in order to create an access point.

References

Populated places in Niue